Tchenguiz is a surname. Notable people with the surname include:

 Vincent Tchenguiz (born 1956), Chairman of Consensus Business Group
 Robert Tchenguiz (born 1960), co-chairman of Rotch Property Group